The ABA-NBA merger was a major pro sports business maneuver in 1976 when the American Basketball Association (ABA) combined with the National Basketball Association (NBA), after multiple attempts over several years. The NBA and ABA had entered merger talks as early as 1970, but an antitrust suit filed by the head of the NBA players union, Robertson v. National Basketball Ass'n, blocked the merger until 1976.

The NBA agreed to accept four of the remaining six ABA teams: the Denver Nuggets, Indiana Pacers, New York Nets, and San Antonio Spurs. The remaining two ABA teams, the Kentucky Colonels and the Spirits of St. Louis, folded, with their players entering a dispersal draft.

Early attempts at merger
From the very beginning, the ABA hoped to force a merger with the NBA, thus repeating the American Football League (AFL)'s successful effort to force a merger with the National Football League (NFL). According to The NBA Encyclopedia, ABA officials told prospective owners that they could get an ABA team for half of what it cost to get an NBA expansion team at the time. The upstart league's officials confidently predicted that if and when a merger occurred, any surviving owners would see their investment more than double.

In contrast to both the earlier AFL and the later World Hockey Association (which both endured significant hostility from their established competitors for many years) the ABA found the NBA owners to be reasonably amenable to a merger relatively early on. As early as June 1970, only three years after the ABA began play, the NBA owners voted 13–4 to work toward a merger with the ABA. Seattle SuperSonics owner Sam Schulman, a member of the ABA–NBA merger committee in 1970, was so ardently eager to merge the leagues that he publicly announced that if the NBA did not accept the merger agreement worked out with the ABA, he would move the SuperSonics from the NBA to the ABA. Schulman also threatened to move his soon-to-be ABA team to Los Angeles to compete directly with the Lakers. The owners of the Dallas Chaparrals (now the NBA's San Antonio Spurs) were so confident of the impending merger that they suggested that the ABA hold off on scheduling and playing a regular season schedule for the 1971–72 season. After the 1970–71 season Basketball Weekly wrote "The American basketball public is clamoring for a merger. So are the NBA and ABA owners, the two commissioners, and every college coach. The war is over. The Armistice will be signed soon". The two leagues continued merger discussions and plans through the early and mid-1970s.

Robertson v. NBA antitrust lawsuit

The early attempts at merging the ABA and NBA were delayed for years by litigation known as the Oscar Robertson suit, styled Robertson v. National Basketball Association, 556 F.2d 682 (2d Cir. 1977). After the NBA owners voted in 1970 to merge with the ABA, the NBA Players Association filed a lawsuit in April 1970 to prevent the merger on antitrust grounds. The existence of the ABA resulted in increased salaries for players in both leagues as the ABA and NBA competed with each other to sign players. The Robertson suit was finally settled on February 3, 1976, but for the entirety of its pendency it presented an insurmountable obstacle to the desired merger of the two leagues.

Congressional action to allow the merger
In 1972, Congress came close to enacting legislation to enable a merger despite the Oscar Robertson suit. In September 1972, a merger bill was reported favorably out of a U.S. Senate committee, but the bill was put together to please the owners, and ended up not pleasing the Senators or the players. The bill subsequently died without coming to a floor vote. When Congress reconvened in 1973, another merger bill was presented to the Senate, but did not advance. As a result of the legislation's failure the ABA installed a new commissioner, Mike Storen, with part of his focus being the eventual merger of the two leagues as equals. Alex Hannum, who coached in both the NBA and ABA, said at the time of Storen, "The most important problem he has is still the merger with the NBA. And I believe his approach is just right for us. Storen wants to build our league to be the strongest. Then he can negotiate with the NBA as an equal". Sports Illustrated noted at the time that "the tactics Storen says the ABA will employ sound a good deal more like those used by AFL Commissioner Al Davis in the last days of the football war than a plan for peaceful coexistence. The ABA has reinstituted its $300 million antitrust suit against the NBA. It also may move some franchises into better TV markets, an ill-advised maneuver that will mean going against established NBA teams on their home turf. And for the first time since 1970 the ABA will go after established NBA players. 'We will have exploratory contract talks with lots of their men,' Storen says. 'Whether we'll sign none, six or 10 of them will depend on how things work out. But you can be sure of one thing: we'll do this in a serious, orderly way'". As a result of the merger legislation not being enacted and the Oscar Robertson suit continuing, the two leagues did not merge until 1976, after the Oscar Robertson suit had finally been settled.

Interleague competition in anticipation of merger
In the summer before the 1971–72 season the ABA and NBA met in an interleague All Star Game. The NBA won a close game, 125–120. In that same preseason, ABA and NBA teams began playing exhibition games against each other. The first such exhibition was played on September 21, 1971, with Kareem Abdul-Jabbar and the Milwaukee Bucks defeating the Dallas Chaparrals, 106–103. The ABA was 15–10 against the NBA in 1973, 16–7 in 1974, and 31–17 in 1975. Overall, the ABA won more of these interleague games than the NBA did, and in every matchup of reigning champions from the two leagues, the ABA champion won, including in the final pre-merger season when the Kentucky Colonels defeated the Golden State Warriors. Boston Globe sportswriter Bob Ryan said of the ABA-NBA exhibition games: "When those exhibition games began, the view in the NBA was, 'Now we'll show those guys.' But then you know what happened—the ABA teams won nearly as often as the NBA did .... Those NBA–ABA games were intense". Longtime NBA coach Larry Brown said of the ABA vs. NBA games, "When some exhibition games were arranged in the 1970s to make some money and we (the ABA) beat them, the NBA said they weren't up for the games. Come on. When I coached Carolina, we played the Knicks after they won a championship. I looked at their guys shooting around and I looked at my guys and I didn't want my players to take off their warm-ups because they looked so scrawny next to the Knicks—and we went out and beat New York. We also played the Celtics a couple of times and beat them. (Celtics coach) Tommy Heinsohn would say that he wasn't playing to win, but I'd check the box score and see that Tommy played his regulars 35 to 40 minutes, so what does that tell you?"

Interest in ABA vs. NBA play extended beyond the two leagues' management. In 1976, CBS sought to establish a postseason playoff between the ABA and NBA, and to win the rights to broadcast those games.

ABA's final season (1975–76)

Two teams attempt to depart
Before the 1975–76 season, the Denver Nuggets and New York Nets applied to join the NBA. The owners of the Nets and Nuggets had approached John Y. Brown, Jr. in an attempt to get his Kentucky Colonels to join their attempted leap to the NBA, but Brown refused, saying he was staying loyal to the ABA. Ultimately, the Nets and Nuggets were forced to play a lame-duck season in the ABA by court order.
The Nuggets' and Nets' attempted move to the NBA created a great deal of ill will within the ABA, and brought attention to the emerging financial weakness of some of the league's lesser teams.

Four teams collapse
Meanwhile, the ABA saw three of its teams (Memphis, San Diego, and Utah) disappear before the end of 1975, with a fourth team (Virginia) limping through the season before folding in early 1976. The Memphis Sounds moved to Baltimore as the Claws, but folded after only three preseason games after failing to post a performance bond with the league.

On November 12, 1975—three weeks into the season—the San Diego Sails folded. The Sails had been plagued by wretched attendance, and their owner had learned the team would most likely be excluded from any upcoming ABA–NBA merger because Los Angeles Lakers owner Jack Kent Cooke did not want competition in Southern California for either his team or their television coverage on the cable television system he owned. The Sails' players were put into a special dispersal draft.

Shortly afterward, the Utah Stars, once one of the league's longstanding and successful teams, folded as well on December 2, 1975, as a result of not making payroll. Bill Daniels, the Stars' owner, was out of money due to his unsuccessful campaign to become Governor of Colorado and difficulties with other business ventures (Daniels eventually paid back all Stars season ticket holders in full plus 8% interest). There had been talks between the Stars and the Spirits of St. Louis about the two teams merging, but the Stars folded before it could happen. Most of the Stars players, including Moses Malone, were sold to the Spirits of St. Louis. With the ABA cut down to seven teams, the league abandoned divisional play.

Another ABA team, the Virginia Squires, struggled considerably in its final two years. The Squires had sold fan favorites such as Julius Erving, Rick Barry, George Gervin, Warren Armstrong, Billy Paultz and Swen Nater because of constant financial problems. In the 1974–75 season, the once-successful Squires posted a league's-worst record of 15–69. In the 1975–76 season the Squires tied their own record, posting the identical league's-worst won-loss record. Moreover, due to dwindling attendance, the Squires were fighting just to survive until the end of the season. On several occasions, the Squires barely made payroll.
By the end of the 1975–76 season, the Squires were at the end of their tether. They were folded by the league on May 11, 1976, after failing to pay a $75,000 league assessment. However, there was virtually no chance of them being included in the merger in any event. The Squires were a "regional" franchise that played home games in three Virginia cities. Regional franchises were not considered viable, and none of the Squires' "home" cities were nearly large enough to support an NBA team.

Final six
After the Squires folded, the Kentucky Colonels, led by Artis Gilmore, defeated the Indiana Pacers in the first round of the 1976 ABA Playoffs. The Colonels, in turn, lost a seven-game semifinal series to the Denver Nuggets, led by Dan Issel and David Thompson. The Nuggets, in turn, lost the ABA Finals to the New York Nets with Julius Erving, who had defeated George Gervin and the San Antonio Spurs to get there. The Spirits of St. Louis and their star Moses Malone had survived the regular season but missed the playoffs. All six teams were still standing as the ABA and NBA, with the Oscar Robertson suit settled, commenced their final merger negotiations. The merger was finally consummated on June 17, 1976, at the NBA league meetings in the Cape Cod Room at Dunfey's Hyannis Resort in Hyannis, Massachusetts.

Two ABA teams folded

Kentucky Colonels
The Colonels were one of the strongest franchises throughout the history of the ABA. In addition, the Kentucky Colonels–Indiana Pacers rivalry was the league's fiercest, and in all of professional basketball (NBA included), the Colonels ranked sixth in attendance. In spite of that history, the Colonels' final games came in the 1976 ABA Playoffs as the defending champions bested the Pacers to advance to the semifinals before bowing out to the Nuggets in a tight seven-game series. John Y. Brown, Jr., the owner of the Colonels, preceded the 1975–76 season by selling star center Dan Issel for $500,000 to the Baltimore Claws. However, when the money never arrived, Brown sent Issel to the Nuggets. Shortly afterward, he sent defensive standout Teddy McClain to the New York Nets for $150,000. Those transactions, especially the sale of former University of Kentucky star Issel, turned off many of the Colonels' fans. Though it was clear to everyone that the Colonels had the talent and the fan support to join the NBA for the 1976–77 season, in the face of various obstacles, Brown had other plans.

During the merger negotiations in June 1976, the NBA made it clear that it would accept only four ABA teams, not five. The Nuggets and Nets, clearly the ABA's two strongest teams, were obvious choices. The Spurs had posted impressive attendance numbers since moving from Dallas, and were thus a very attractive choice. On paper, the Colonels were the logical choice for the fourth and final team, and likely would have joined the NBA if not for the intervention of the Chicago Bulls.

After the Colonels, the Indiana Pacers were the next most viable choice. While the Bulls realized an NBA team in Indianapolis would significantly encroach on their own fanbase and television market, they nevertheless had a number of strong incentives to support Indiana's entry into the NBA over Kentucky's. First, the Bulls were themselves a relatively young franchise, only pre-dating the ABA and the Pacers by one year, and thus had never been able to develop much of following in Indiana to begin with. The Bulls knew if they were to be seen as having a hand in the Pacers' demise, they could never expect to be forgiven let alone supported by Indiana basketball fans. Moreover, Indianapolis also had what was (at the time) a relatively strong World Hockey Association team, the Indianapolis Racers. Whereas Kentucky was never a part of the WHA, the Racers were still then seen to be likely to be included in any NHL–WHA merger that might happen, especially if they no longer had a major professional basketball team to compete with. Furthermore, since the entry of the Milwaukee Bucks into the league had blossomed into a lucrative local rivalry for the Bulls, the team decided it would be more profitable to bring Indiana into the NBA as opposed to trying to keep the Pacers out. Finally, the Bulls had a strong basketball-related reason to push for Kentucky's exclusion—they desperately wanted Colonels star Artis Gilmore, whose NBA rights the Bulls owned. Thus, the Bulls fought hard to keep the Colonels out of the merger.

Brown saw the writing on the wall and decided that it was better to fold the Colonels for cash, instead of continuing to fight. On June 17, 1976, the Colonels reached a financial agreement with the remaining teams in the ABA and agreed to fold in exchange for $3 million. According to the terms of the ABA–NBA merger the Kentucky Colonels players were placed into a dispersal draft (along with the players from the Spirits of St. Louis). The Chicago Bulls took Gilmore for $1.1 million. The Portland Trail Blazers took Maurice Lucas for $300,000, the Buffalo Braves took Bird Averitt for $125,000, the Indiana Pacers took Wil Jones for $50,000, the New York Nets took Jan van Breda Kolff for $60,000, and the San Antonio Spurs took Louie Dampier for $20,000. With the funds he received from the agreement with the other ABA teams and Colonels players sold in the dispersal draft, Brown promptly turned around and bought the NBA's Buffalo Braves for $1.5 million, and parlayed the Braves into ownership of the Boston Celtics.

Spirits of St. Louis
Brothers Ozzie and Daniel Silna had made a fortune as pioneers in the manufacture of polyester, and they wanted to own an NBA team. After an attempt to purchase the Detroit Pistons fell short, the Silnas purchased the ABA's Carolina Cougars franchise with the expectation of moving it into the NBA with the impending merger of the two leagues. The Silna brothers moved the Cougars to St. Louis, because it was then the largest city in the United States without a professional basketball team, and they thought this would make their team more likely to join the NBA. In 1974, the Cougars, roster and all, were overhauled and became the ABA's Spirits of St. Louis from 1974 through 1976. The 1974–75 Spirits had upset the reigning ABA champion New York Nets in the 1975 Eastern Division Finals before losing to the eventual champion Kentucky Colonels, but in the 1975–76 season the Spirits' play was uneven and their attendance waned.

The 1975–76 season had not turned out so well in terms of either attendance or wins on the court. In May 1976, due to attendance problems in St. Louis, the Spirits announced that they were going to move to Salt Lake City, Utah, to play as the Utah Rockies when a lease agreement for the Salt Palace was arranged. This followed an attempted merger of the Spirits and the Utah Stars franchise during the 1975–76 season, a merger that, had it occurred, contemplated the team leaving St. Louis for Utah. But the Stars folded before the merger could occur and instead, the Spirits bought the rights to some of the Stars' best players, including Moses Malone. In an effort to be included in the ABA–NBA merger, the Spirits' owners, proposed selling the Spirits to a Utah group, buying the Kentucky Colonels franchise, and moving the Colonels to Buffalo to replace the Buffalo Braves, who were then planning to move to the Miami region (The Buffalo franchise would eventually move to Southern California, first as the San Diego Clippers before moving north to Los Angeles;  Salt Lake City and Miami eventually gained NBA franchises, Salt Lake City through the move of New Orleans a few years later in 1979, and Miami via expansion in 1988). The Spirits were not included in the merger, but the Silna brothers nonetheless managed to turn the merger, for them, into one of the greatest deals in the history of professional sports:

In June 1976, the remaining ABA owners agreed, in return for the Spirits folding, to pay the St. Louis owners $2.2 million in cash up front in addition to a 1/7 share of the four remaining teams' television revenues in perpetuity. As the NBA's popularity exploded in the 1980s and 1990s, the league's television rights were sold to CBS and then NBC, and additional deals were struck with the TNT and TBS cable networks; league television revenue soared into the hundreds of millions of dollars. The Silnas continued to receive millions of dollars in television revenue from the NBA until reaching a revised agreement in April 2014, which included a $500 million payment to the Silnas from the four former ABA teams.

The terms of the ABA–NBA merger included the Spirits of St. Louis players being put into a special dispersal draft along with the Kentucky Colonels players. Marvin Barnes went to the Detroit Pistons for $500,000, Moses Malone went to the Portland Trail Blazers for $300,000, Ron Boone went to the Kansas City Kings for $250,000, Randy Denton went to the New York Knicks for $50,000 and Mike Barr went to the Kansas City Kings for $15,000.

Twelve players from the final two Spirits of St. Louis rosters (1974–76) played in the NBA during the 1976–77 season and beyond: Maurice Lucas, Ron Boone, Marvin Barnes, Caldwell Jones, Lonnie Shelton, Steve Green, Gus Gerard, Moses Malone, Don Adams, Don Chaney, M. L. Carr and Freddie Lewis.

Merger terms for the four ABA teams
The NBA imposed the following terms on the four ABA refugees—the Denver Nuggets, Indiana Pacers, New York Nets and San Antonio Spurs:
 The new teams' arrival was treated as an expansion, not a merger. Each of the four remaining ABA teams had to pay a $3.2 million expansion fee to the NBA by September 15, 1976. The NBA also refused to recognize ABA records.
 The New York Nets were to pay an additional $4.8 million indemnity directly to their in-town rival, the New York Knicks, as compensation for "invading" the New York area.
 The four ABA teams would receive no television money at all during their first three seasons in the NBA (1976–1979), and were to pay one seventh of their annual television revenues after that to the owners of the defunct Spirits of St. Louis in perpetuity.
 The four ABA teams would receive no votes related to the distribution of gate receipts or the alignment of NBA divisions for two years.
 The remaining players from the Kentucky Colonels and the Spirits of St. Louis would be made available to NBA teams through a dispersal draft, with superstars such as Artis Gilmore and Moses Malone going to teams other than the four ABA teams.
 The four ABA teams as new NBA franchises would not be allowed to participate in the 1976 NBA Draft, but were allowed to select players from the Colonels and Spirits in the dispersal draft.

Compared to the other mergers of the 1970s, the terms of the merger in basketball are generally seen as falling between the earlier merger in football and the later merger in hockey. The indemnities and other penalties were at least as draconian as the penalties that the AFL teams in existing NFL markets faced as a consequence of the AFL–NFL merger in 1970, however among the notable concessions from the NFL were that no AFL teams were forced to fold and AFL records were fully integrated into the older league's history. On the other hand, the NBA did permit the surviving ABA teams to enter the league with their rosters intact (although some ABA players were promptly sold to help the ABA owners meet their financial obligations) whereas, in addition to financial and draft terms at least as harsh as those endured by the ABA, WHA teams lost most of their existing players without compensation in a "reclamation draft" when they joined the National Hockey League.

The Nets offered their superstar forward Julius Erving to the Knicks in return for waiving the $4.8 million indemnity, but the Knicks declined the offer. Instead, Erving was sent to the Philadelphia 76ers for $3 million. In effect, the Nets traded their franchise player for a berth in the NBA.

Results of the ABA–NBA merger

Immediate results
In the first NBA All Star Game after the merger, 10 of the 24 NBA All Stars were former ABA players.

In the first post-merger season's NBA Finals between the Portland Trail Blazers and the Philadelphia 76ers, five of the ten starting players were former ABA players. Those five starters from the ABA were Julius Erving, Caldwell Jones, George McGinnis, Dave Twardzik and Maurice Lucas.

Of the 84 players in the ABA at the time of the merger, 63 played in the NBA during the 1976–77 season. In that first post-merger season, four of the NBA's top ten scorers had come over from the ABA (Billy Knight, David Thompson, Dan Issel and George Gervin).

Don Buse, who joined the NBA with the Pacers, led the NBA in both steals and assists during that first post-merger season. The Spirits of St. Louis' Moses Malone finished third in rebounding; the Kentucky Colonels' Artis Gilmore was fourth. Gilmore and his former Colonels teammate Caldwell Jones were both among the top five in the NBA in blocked shots.

Tom Nissalke left the ABA to coach the NBA's Houston Rockets in the first post-merger season and won the Central Division; Nissalke was named NBA Coach of the Year. Former Kentucky Colonels coach Hubie Brown took over the NBA's Atlanta Hawks, and the four former ABA teams kept their coaches as they entered the NBA.

Denver Nuggets
In 1974, Denver changed its name from the Denver Rockets to the Denver Nuggets in anticipation of the ABA–NBA merger, because the NBA already had a team called the Houston Rockets.

In their first NBA season, the Nuggets—a team that had never won an ABA championship—finished with the league's second-best record, 50–32, and won the Midwest Division. In their second NBA season, the Nuggets repeated as Midwest Division champions, and in their third season the Nuggets missed a third consecutive division title by a single game. Although the financial and draft penalties caused the team to slip a little bit after coach Larry Brown's departure, the Nuggets would remain an NBA power throughout the 1980s. After a period of mediocre play through most of the 1990s and early 2000s, the Nuggets recovered and made the playoffs ten years in a row from 2004 to 2013, though to date they are the only former ABA team to have never played in the NBA Finals.

San Antonio Spurs
The Spurs, who could never get past the first round of the ABA playoffs before the merger, won NBA division titles in five of their first six NBA seasons, largely on the strength of superstar guard George Gervin. This was in spite of the financial and draft penalties imposed on the team. The Spurs then went through a period of decline in the late 1980s, but rebounded in the 1990s, and in 1999 became the first former ABA team to both reach and win the NBA Finals; as of the end of the 2018–19 season they are the only former ABA team to win a title. They have since won four more NBA titles, in 2003, 2005, 2007 and 2014. In 2003, the NBA Finals matched two former ABA teams, the Spurs and the New Jersey Nets.

Indiana Pacers
After years of being the ABA's strongest team on the court and at the box office, the merger caught the Pacers at an awkward moment financially. As mentioned above, they were included in the merger more or less as an afterthought after the Bulls effectively vetoed the inclusion of the Colonels, who were on far stronger footing financially. The team had started unloading their stars during the last ABA season. After their first NBA season, the Pacers resorted to broadcasting a successful telethon in order to survive financially into their second NBA season. In part thanks to the telethon, led by Nancy Leonard (wife of Hall of Fame coach Bobby Leonard), the Pacers' average attendance jumped from 7,615 during the 1976–77 season, their first in the NBA, to 10,982 during the 1977–78 season.

The Pacers finished their inaugural NBA season with a record of 36–46. Pacers Billy Knight and Don Buse represented Indiana in the NBA All-Star Game. However, this was one of the few bright spots of the Pacers' first 13 years in the NBA. During this time, they had only two non-losing seasons and only two playoff appearances. Finally overcoming the draft and financial penalties imposed in the merger, the Pacers won NBA Central Division championships in 1995, 1999, 2000, 2004, 2013 and 2014. They reached the NBA Finals in 2000, and reached the Eastern Conference finals in the previous two years and again in 2013 and 2014.

New York Nets

The Nets, severely handicapped by the financial penalties placed upon the team, sold Julius Erving to the Philadelphia 76ers. Nate Archibald, the one bright spot left on the roster, broke his foot and the Nets finished their first NBA season at 22–60, the worst record in the league. After their first NBA season, the Nets moved to New Jersey and had a few more weak seasons there before finally improving in the early 1980s as they overcame the financial penalties imposed on them during the merger. By 1984, the Nets were making the NBA playoffs and by 2002 the Nets finally made the NBA Finals, losing to the Los Angeles Lakers. They made it to the NBA Finals again in 2003, this time losing to the San Antonio Spurs, another former ABA team. In 2012, the Nets moved to Brooklyn.

Nets' owner Roy Boe said of the merger, "The merger agreement killed the Nets as an NBA franchise. ...The merger agreement got us into the NBA, but it forced me to destroy the team by selling Erving to pay the bill".

ABA dispersal draft, 1976
The rosters of the Kentucky Colonels and Spirits of St. Louis were put into a special dispersal draft in 1976.

ABA contributions to NBA play

3-point field goal
The three-point field goal was used in the ABA; the NBA originally disparaged it, but eventually adopted it in the 1979–80 season.

Angelo Drossos, owner of the San Antonio Spurs: "When the leagues merged, the NBA moguls didn't want the 3-point shot. Red Auerbach hated it and said the Celtics would never go along with it. He had everybody up in arms against the play. Of course, a few years later Red drafted Larry Bird and suddenly he was all for it. And suddenly one of the bigger attractions at the All-Star Game is the 3-point shootout".

Slam Dunk Contest
The ABA originated the idea of the slam dunk contest at the 1976 ABA All Star Game; the NBA subsequently held their first one in 1984. The slam dunk contest has ever since been a major part of the NBA's All Star Weekend (with the exception of 1998, 1999 and 2021).

Pressing and trapping defenses
Pressing and trapping defenses, rarely used in the slower-tempo NBA, were common in the ABA, and after the merger began to play a larger role in the NBA.

Billy Cunningham, Philadelphia 76ers star: "When the Knicks were pressing and shooting 3-pointers and all of that under Rick Pitino, people acted as if that was something new. Hey, half the teams in the ABA played like that".

Hubie Brown, former head coach of the Kentucky Colonels, Atlanta Hawks, New York Knicks and Memphis Grizzlies: "We (the ABA) were ahead of the NBA in so many different ways. We had the 3-point play. The NBA said it was a gimmick; now it's one of the most exciting parts of the pro game... About everything we did in the ABA they do now in the NBA except they didn't take our red, white and blue ball". Eventually, the NBA revived the ABA's red, white and blue ball as the "Money Ball" in the NBA's Three-Point Contest.

Faster pace of play
The ABA had a far faster pace than the NBA, and this carried over into the NBA after the merger; today's NBA game is largely derived from the ABA. Longtime Denver Nuggets head coach and ABA alum Doug Moe, who also coached the Philadelphia 76ers, has commented, "The NBA now plays our (the ABA's) kind of basketball".

Drafting of underclassmen
Prior to the ABA, the NBA did not allow college underclassmen to enter the league. In 1969 the ABA's Denver Rockets signed Spencer Haywood, a sophomore star at the University of Detroit who had played on the 1968 United States men's Olympic basketball team. The NCAA sued, but Haywood and the ABA prevailed. Julius Erving and George Gervin also joined the ABA's Virginia Squires as underclassmen, as did Jim Chones going from Marquette University to the New York Nets, George McGinnis from Indiana University to the Indiana Pacers and Ralph Simpson from Michigan State to the Denver Rockets. Moses Malone joined the ABA's Utah Stars straight out of high school. Eventually after the merger the NBA followed suit. Although the practice has never been without its share of critics, the drafting of college underclassmen has become common in the NBA and high school players were also selected in subsequent NBA drafts.

Pension fund 
When the ABA finally dissolved, so did its pension fund. Players who had played for the ABA prior to the merger had expected to eventually draw on those pensions, only to find the money was gone. In 2014, a class action lawsuit was filed on behalf of 204 former ABA players claiming that the NBA, when it absorbed the ABA, failed to follow the Employee Retirement Income Security Act (ERISA). The suit was settled for a total of $800,000 (less than $4,000 per claimant), but the players, organized into a group called Dropping Dimes, have continued to fight for an equitable share of the NBA profits.

Legacy
Naismith Memorial Basketball Hall of Fame member Julius Erving: "In my mind, the NBA has just become a bigger version of the ABA. They play the style of game that we did. They sell their stars like we did. The only difference is that they have more resources and can do it on a much grander scale than we in the ABA ever could".
Denver Nuggets, San Antonio Spurs and Philadelphia 76ers head coach Doug Moe: "One of the biggest disappointments in my life was going into the NBA after the merger. The NBA was a rinky-dink league—listen, I'm very serious about this. The league was run like garbage. There was no camaraderie; a lot of the NBA guys were aloof and thought they were too good to practice or play hard. The NBA All-Star Games were nothing—guys didn't even want to play in them and the fans could [sic] care less about the games. It wasn't until the 1980s, when David Stern became commissioner, that the NBA figured out what the hell they were doing, and what they did was a lot of stuff we had in the ABA—from the 3-point shot to All-Star weekend to the show biz stuff. Now the NBA is like the old ABA. Guys play hard, they show their enthusiasm and there is a closeness in the league. Hell, the ABA might have lost the battle, but we won the war. The NBA now plays our kind of basketball".
Sportswriter Bob Ryan: "When writers such as Jim O'Brien and Peter Vescey wrote that the two leagues were very close, that some ABA teams were among the top five of all pro basketball teams, I thought they had no objectivity and that they were too close to the teams they were writing about to really understand pro basketball. Then came the merger, and Denver and San Antonio won division titles. What could I say?  Guys like Jim O'Brien were right".
 A fictional account of the merger is a major plot point in the 2008 film Semi-Pro.

See also

AFL–NFL merger
NHL–WHA merger
1961 MLB expansion
All-America Football Conference

References

Sources
Pluto, Terry, Loose Balls: The Short, Wild Life of the American Basketball Association (Simon & Schuster, 1990), 
Ray Kennedy, A Celtic Rookie Puts It Together: First-year Commissioner Larry O'Brien used his Irish gift of gab to lead the NBA owners into a merger with the ABA, Sports Illustrated, October 25, 1976
Pattison, Dan, Count Dracula Has Struck, January 1976

External links
RememberTheABA.com
Dan Pattison article on failure of 3 ABA franchises during the league's final season
Darren Rovell, NBA Edition: Silna Family "Fortune" And The Draft, CNBC, June 28, 2007

1976–77 NBA season
National Basketball Association history
American Basketball Association
Brooklyn Nets
Indiana Pacers
Kentucky Colonels
San Antonio Spurs
Spirits of St. Louis
Virginia Squires
Denver Nuggets
New York Nets
Sports-related mergers